This is a list of Byzantine strategoi (governors) of Serbia in the Early Middle Ages. Serbia was administrated into the Catepanate of Ras (fl. 969–976) and Theme of Sirmium (1018–1071).

See also
Lists of rulers of Serbia
List of Serbian monarchs

References

 
 
 
 

Byzantine Serbia
10th century in Serbia
11th century in Serbia
Serbia history-related lists
Serbia politics-related lists
Lists of office-holders in the Byzantine Empire
Middle Ages-related lists